Dark Stairways is a 1924 American silent mystery film directed by Robert F. Hill and starring Herbert Rawlinson, Ruth Dwyer, and Hayden Stevenson.

Cast

Preservation
With no prints of Dark Stairways located in any film archives, it is a lost film.

References

Bibliography
 Munden, Kenneth White. The American Film Institute Catalog of Motion Pictures Produced in the United States, Part 1. University of California Press, 1997.

External links

1924 films
1924 mystery films
1920s English-language films
American silent feature films
American mystery films
American black-and-white films
Films directed by Robert F. Hill
Universal Pictures films
Silent mystery films
1920s American films